Jafriya Disaster Management Cell Welfare Organization (JDC), commonly known as JDC Foundation Pakistan, is a welfare and non-governmental organization (NGO) mainly operating in Pakistan. It was established in 2009 by Syed Zafar Abbas Jafri and some like-minded youths of Karachi. Sibt-e-Jaafar Zaidi was also one of its founding members, he stayed an active member of JDC until his assassination in March of 2013. JDC welcomes volunteers from all walks of life and it prides itself in not discriminating members based on their beliefs, political or social background. Rehabilitation activities and medical emergency services by JDC mainly covers the Sindh province. Currently, the organization has expanded its activities all across Pakistan with its policy that where there is a victim of any disaster he/she should be helped simply on humanitarian aspect without discrimination on the basis of race, religion or sect.

It operates an ambulance set-up all over Pakistan and helps in emergency and efforts after disasters. In a year, besides its volunteers, departmental heads and president, at least two JDC-Ambulance drivers have lost their lives in targeted killing. In 2014 JDC provided medical aid by organizing a medical camp in collaboration with Pakistan Red Crescent Society

JDC as an NGO

Edhi, Chhipa, Saylani, Al-Khidmat and KKF are among some well-known NGOs working in Pakistan, whom the majority of donors like to make a charity contribution. While slighter in popularity, there are some other substantial organizations, like JDC (NGO) working on pure humanitarian grounds. Although its working potential mainly covers Karachi and other cities of Sindh, however, JDC attempts to connect it with all people affected by any disasters in any corner of Pakistan, recently in March 2015 a large number of people joined a vigil organised by Jafaria Disaster Management Cell and Karachi based Civil Society of Pakistan in solidarity with the affected families of the Lahore church bombings, with a manifesto to educate the society that the blood of the people belonging to all sects and religions is equally priceless without any discrimination.

COVID-19 pandemic in Pakistan
Not only JDC  almost each and every NGO in the Sindh Province has started distribution of packed daily cooking stuff (flour, vegetable oils, sugar etc.) for helping the needy people being effected  by lock down due to closure of routine business especially daily wagers as a result of the COVID-19 outbreak. Thousands of families of daily wagers are provided with the basic ration everyday by JDC welfare trust.

Heatwave in Karachi
Dead bodies which cannot be spaced in other hospitals/cold-storage houses for hygienic storage due to the 2015 Pakistani heat wave emergency situation, JDC established a temporary cold storage at Numaish Chowrangi until arrangements for burial were made. The increase in sudden deaths the metropolitan Karachi faced led to the scarcity of gravesites for burial of dead, causing abnormal hike in price. Thus JDC Foundation decided to help with cash for burial arrangement to overcome the huge burden for booking a grave in Karachi’s graveyards and funeral in time.

Wall of Kindness 
The idea of charity work viral through social media and people of different countries e.g. India, China, Turkey etc. followed the method of helping needy people at different places. In Pakistan, JDC in 2016 introduced the concept of “Diwar-e-Mehrbani” (Wall of Kindness) and “Bazaar-e-Mehrbani” (Market of Kindness), which was conducted at  Expo Centre Karachi. Under the Wall of Kindness initiative, new and usable cloths are hanged on the wall at a selected place for the carry away and use of needy people.

It has donated  20 metal detectors and jammers to Karachi University and provided free of cost four walk-through gates for six months for safety of students, teaching and non-teaching staff and other visitors

Religious activities
On 6 May 2019, JDC volunteers cooked red ostrich meat for the first Suhur of the Ramadan (of the 1440 Hijri year) to residents of Karachi for their fast.

Associated Press of Pakistan reports a world record made at Numaish Chowrangi, Karachi by 12,800 oil Lamps lighting on occasion of    Jashn-i-Eid-i-Milad-un-Nabi.

Flood relief campaign 
JDC took part in the flood relief campaign across Pakistan when the rural areas of Sindh, Baluchistan, and KPK were affected by floods in September 2022. A large amount of donations were contributed by individuals and organizations like banking Institutions. The two months campaign was run under the supervision of the co-founder, Zafar Abbas.

References

Ambulance services in Pakistan
Emergency medical services in Pakistan
Organisations based in Sindh
Islamic relief organizations
Social welfare charities based in Pakistan